Big Brother Brasil 1, known at the time only as Big Brother Brasil was the debut season of Big Brother Brasil, the Brazilian version of the international reality show Big Brother, which premiered on January 29, 2002 on Rede Globo.

The show was produced by Endemol Globo and originally presented by journalist Pedro Bial and actress Marisa Orth. However, Orth left her hosting duties early in the series but continued making appearances in pre-taped segments.

The prize award was R$500.000 without tax allowances, plus a R$30.000 prize offered to the runner-up and a R$20.000 prize offered to the housemate in third place.

The winner was 24-year-old dancer Kleber de Paula, from Campinas, São Paulo.

Overview
There were twelve housemates competing for the grand prize. The season lasted 64 days nearly a two-three weeks shorter than most seasons, making this the shortest season of the Brazilian series of Big Brother.

Reunion show
The reunion was hosted by Pedro Bial and aired on April 7, 2002. All the former housemates attended.

Housemates
(ages stated at time of contest)

Future appearances
In 2013, Kleber Bambam, the winner from this season returned to compete in Big Brother Brasil 13, he walked out of the game and finished in 17th place in the competition.

Voting history

Notes

References

External links
 Big Brother Brasil 1
 Terra: BBB1

2002 Brazilian television seasons
01